Aidonochori is a village located in the Neapoli municipal unit, situated in western Kozani regional unit, in Greece.

Aidonochori is situated at an altitude of 720 meters above sea level.  The postal code is 50001, and the telephone code is +30 24680.  At the 2011 census, the population was 89.

References

Populated places in Kozani (regional unit)